MOEF may refer to:

 Mid-Ocean Escort Force, the organisation of anti-submarine escorts for World War II trade convoys
 Ministry of Environment and Forests (India)
 Ministry of Economy and Finance (South Korea)